A peascod belly is a type of exaggeratedly padded stomach that was very popular in men's dress in the late 16th and early 17th centuries. The term is thought to have come from "peacock," or from the form of contemporary plate armour. Sometimes it was called a 'goose belly.'

In the late 16th century the stomach of the doublet was padded to stick out, however, by 1625, the padding had become more evenly distributed over the chest area.

References

16th-century fashion
17th-century fashion